The National Library of Nicaragua Rubén Darío is the national library of Nicaragua, located in the city of Managua. It was founded in 1880, and damaged in the 1931 earthquake. Another earthquake in 1972 caused further damage, furthermore, it was looted. One of its librarians was the poet Rubén Darío, in whose honour it was renamed. The total stock of the library is 120.000 volumes.

Directors

Directors of the library:
 Modesto Barrios
 Miguel Ramírez Goyena
 Ramón Romero Martínez
 Carlos Bravo
 Eduardo Zepeda-Henríquez
 Lisandro Chávez Alfaro
 Fidel Coloma González

See also
 Destruction of libraries

References

External links

Nicaragua
Libraries in Nicaragua
1880 establishments in North America